12 Hours With is an American documentary series that was released from October 8 to 18, 2021 on Facebook Watch for National Hispanic Heritage Month. The four-episode miniseries follows Latin American singers and pop icons Maluma, Anitta, Prince Royce, and Mariah Angeliq as they return to their touring schedules in the wake of the COVID-19 pandemic.

Premise
Four Latin American music artists (Maluma, born in Colombia; Anitta, born in Brazil; Mariah Angelique, born in Miami to Cuban and Puerto Rican parents; and Prince Royce, born in New York City to Dominican parents) reflect upon how their heritage and roots helped build a foundation for their music careers.

Episodes

See also
 List of original programs distributed by Facebook Watch

References

External links
 
 12 Hours With on Facebook

Facebook Watch original programming
2020s American reality television series
2021 American television series debuts
2021 American television series endings
American non-fiction web series
Anitta